Anthony James "A. J." Thelen (born March 11, 1986) is an American retired professional ice hockey defenseman. He was drafted by the Minnesota Wild in the 2004 NHL Entry Draft, selected 12th overall.

Playing career
After playing for the U.S. National Under-18 Development Program in 2002–03, Thelen joined Michigan State University to play college hockey. After his freshman season in 2003–04, he was drafted in the first round, 12th overall, in the 2004 NHL Entry Draft by the Minnesota Wild. Following his sophomore season with Michigan State, however, he was dismissed by the league for rules infractions.

Accordingly, he joined the major junior Western Hockey League (WHL) with the Prince Albert Raiders. Upon completing his first season in the WHL, Thelen was assigned by the Wild to their American Hockey League (AHL) affiliate, the Houston Aeros, where he made his professional debut, playing in one game. The next season, in 2006–07, after missing some time due to a knee sprain, Thelen was traded by the Raiders to the Vancouver Giants, in exchange for defenseman John Flatters and prospect Nathan Deck, where he captured the 2007 Memorial Cup championship with the Giants as tournament hosts.

Unsigned by the Wild out of major junior, Thelen turned pro in the ECHL with the Texas Wildcatters, tallying 35 points in his rookie season.

In 2008–09, Thelen joined the Florida Everblades. During the 2009-10 ECHL season, Thelen was named to the ECHL All-Star Team and took part in the skills competition. Thelen won the Hardest Shot Competition with a shot of 101.9 mph. On February 13, 2010, Thelen would suffer another concussion, the third of his career. He attempted to come back a week later, but ended up sitting out the rest of the season due to post-concussion syndrome.

On September 17, 2010, Thelen signed with the Kalamazoo Wings, the ECHL affiliate of the NHL's New York Islanders

With back issues and a history of concussions, Thelen retired from hockey after the completion of the 2010-11 ECHL season at age 25.

Career statistics

Awards and honors

References

External links

1986 births
American men's ice hockey defensemen
Florida Everblades players
Houston Aeros (1994–2013) players
Ice hockey players from Minnesota
Kalamazoo Wings (ECHL) players
Living people
Michigan State Spartans men's ice hockey players
Minnesota Wild draft picks
National Hockey League first-round draft picks
Prince Albert Raiders players
Rochester Americans players
Texas Wildcatters players
Vancouver Giants players
USA Hockey National Team Development Program players
People from Savage, Minnesota
AHCA Division I men's ice hockey All-Americans